Aaron Trinder (born 6 November 1980) is a New Zealand professional rugby league footballer who currently plays for the Norths Devils in the Queensland Cup.

Playing career
In 2001 Trinder played for the Newtown Jets in the NSWRL First Division.

In 2005 Trinder played for the Manly Sea Eagles in the NSWRL Premier League before moving to the North Sydney Bears for the 2006 season.

In 2007 Trinder moved to England, joining Halifax.

He returned to Australia in 2009 when he was signed by the Norths Devils from the Dewsbury Rams, where he had spent the 2008 season. He was retained by Norths for the 2010 Queensland Cup season.

Representative career
Trinder is a New Zealand Māori international. In 1998 he played for the Junior Kiwis.

References

External links
Norths Devils QLD Cup Player Profiles Norths Devils

1980 births
Living people
Dewsbury Rams players
Halifax R.L.F.C. players
Junior Kiwis players
New Zealand Māori rugby league players
New Zealand Māori rugby league team players
New Zealand rugby league players
Newtown Jets NSW Cup players
North Sydney Bears NSW Cup players
Norths Devils players
Place of birth missing (living people)